is a rechargeable contactless smart card ticketing system for public transport introduced by Takamatsu-Kotohira Electric Railroad (Kotoden) in Takamatsu, Japan from February 2, 2005. The name comes from IC and iruka (dolphin), the latter being the mascot character of the company. Just like JR East's Suica or JR West's ICOCA, the card uses RFID technology developed by Sony corporation known as FeliCa. As of July 2006, 77,000 cards are issued.

The card is usable in all the Kotoden railway lines, as well as Kotoden bus lines. The function as an electronic money is also experimented in the limited number of stores in Takamatsu, including Tenmaya Department Store.

Types of cards

IruCa commuter pass: A rechargeable commuter pass.
IruCa ticket:
Free IruCa: Blue. A blank card that doesn't need a registration.
School IruCa: Yellow. Students of some selected schools can use this.
Senior IruCa: Purple. For 65 years old or above.
Kids IruCa: Red. For elementary school students.
Green IruCa: Green. For handicapped customers. Fares always become half priced.

External links 
  Official website by Kotoden
  Dokoiko Portal, Takamatsu map showing stores that accept IruCa.

Fare collection systems in Japan
Contactless smart cards